Life One was a British television channel owned and operated by Life TV Media which launched in August 2007 as the fourth television channel from the company. Life One was the last Life TV Media channel broadcasting on Sky Digital.

The programming was split into seven 'zones' and each zone is focused on different types of programmes. The seven zones are Lifestyle, Factual, Sports, Music, Reality, Drama and Films.

Before it suddenly went off air and off the Sky listings on 11 March 2008, Life One broadcast for 24 hours a day on Sky Channel 197.  No explanation was given for its unexpected disappearance. However, after a few weeks of testing outside of the EPG (by manually tuning it in) Life One returned to its old slot on Sky's EPG at channel number 197.

However, Life One closed down again on 16 June 2008.

Life One then relaunched as 'Life' on 11 August 2008 on Sky EPG 197 and it timeshares with Over 18 TV.

'Life' moved to channel number 186 on 1 September 2008.

'Life' was removed from the Sky EPG on 15 September 2009.

Satellite television
Television channels in the United Kingdom
Television channels and stations established in 2007